Premier League Cup may refer to:

Association football
FA Women's Premier League Cup
Russian Premier League Cup
Scottish Women's Premier League Cup
Premier League Cup (football), an English youth tournament

Motorcycle speedway
Premier League Cup (speedway), a regional league competition contested by teams in the British Premier League
Premier League Knockout Cup, a knock out competition contested by teams in the British Premier League